Heroes is an album by American pianist David Benoit released in 2008 and recorded for the Peak label. The album is Benoit's tribute to his musical 'heroes' who influenced his career, including Bill Evans, Dave Brubeck, and Dave Grusin.

Heroes reached No. 9 on the Billboard Contemporary Jazz Albums chart.

Track listing
"Mountain Dance" (Dave Grusin) - 4:04
"Human Nature" (John Bettis, Steve Porcaro) - 4:12
"Your Song" (Elton John, Bernie Taupin) - 3:49
"Light My Fire" (Robbie Krieger, John Densmore, Jim Morrison, Ray Manzarek) - 4:00
"Never Can Say Goodbye" (Clifton Davis) - 4:19
"She's Leaving Home" (John Lennon, Paul McCartney) - 3:35
"Song for My Father" (Horace Silver) - 3:20
"You Look Good to Me" (Walter Donaldson) - 2:56
"Waltz for Debby" (Bill Evans) - 5:03*
"A Twisted Little Etude" (David Benoit) - 2:29
"Blue Rondo à la Turk" (Dave Brubeck) - 5:00

"Waltz for Debby" (track 9) is incorrectly listed in the liner notes as "Waltz for Debbie"

Personnel 
 David Benoit – pianos, synthesizers, arrangements and conductor 
 David Hughes – acoustic bass, electric bass 
 Jamey Tate – drums
 Brad Dutz – percussion
 Andy Suzuki – alto saxophone, tenor saxophone 
 Cathy Biagini – cello
 John Wang – viola 
 Yun Tang – violin, concertmaster
 Darryl Tanikawa – music contractor

Production 
 David Benoit – producer 
 Andi Howard – executive producer 
 Mark Wexler – executive producer 
 Clark Germain – engineer, mixing
 Rob Montez – assistant engineer
 Chris Bellman – mastering at Bernie Grundman Mastering (Hollywood, CA).
 Valerie Ince – A&R coordinator
 Yvonne Wish – project coordinator
 Sonny Mediana – art direction, design, photography

Charts

References

External links
David Benoit/Heroes at Discogs
David Benoit/Heroes at AllMusic
David Benoit's Official Site

2008 albums
David Benoit (musician) albums
Peak Records albums